Pobądz  (German: Pobanz) is a village in the administrative district of Gmina Tychowo, within Białogard County, West Pomeranian Voivodeship, in north-western Poland.

For the history of the region, see History of Pomerania.

People 
 Hermann von Tresckow (1849-1933), German general

References

Villages in Białogard County